I Do, I Do may refer to:

 I Do! I Do! (musical), a 1966 musical by Tom Jones and Harvey Schmidt
 I Do, I Do (film), a 2005 Singaporean romantic comedy film
 I Do, I Do (TV series), a 2012 South Korean MBC romantic-comedy television drama
 A 2019 song by Park Bom
 An episode of The Jeffersons

See also
 "I Do Do", an episode of the American TV series 30 Rock
 "I Do, I Do, I Do, I Do", an episode of Eight is Enough
 "I Do, I Do, I Do, I Do, I Do", a song by ABBA
 I Do (disambiguation)